Maksim Nikolayevich Dubovik (born 17 April 1973) is a former Russian football player.

References

1973 births
Living people
Soviet footballers
FC Luch Vladivostok players
Russian footballers
Russian Premier League players
FC Sibir Novosibirsk players
FC Oryol players
FC Yugra Nizhnevartovsk players

Association football midfielders